David Sutcliffe (born June 8, 1969) is a Canadian-American retired actor. He is known for playing Christopher Hayden on the television series Gilmore Girls and Detective Aidan Black on the television series Cracked.

Early life
Sutcliffe was born in Saskatoon, Saskatchewan, and raised in Grimsby and St. Catharines, Ontario. He studied English literature at Victoria College in the University of Toronto. He was recruited to play varsity basketball at university, but had to give up the sport when he was diagnosed with a herniated disk.

Career
Sutcliffe has appeared in numerous television shows; his most notable roles are Adam Williams on Cold Feet, Patrick Owen on I'm with Her, Christopher Hayden on Gilmore Girls, Officer Kevin Nelson on Private Practice, Detective Aidan Black on Cracked and Dr. Len Barliss on Proof.

He was also in an episode of the show Nancy Drew in 1995, titled "Exile", playing the character of actor Tyler Reed.

Sutcliffe's film work includes Cake, Testosterone, Under the Tuscan Sun, Misconceptions and the television films Murder in the Hamptons and Before You Say I Do.

He also produced and directed the 11-part documentary series Group, about a week-long group therapy retreat.

On May 20, 2019, Sutcliffe announced his retirement from acting via his official Facebook page.

Other work
Sutcliffe is also a Certified Core Energetics Practitioner, a graduate of the Radical Aliveness Institute of Southern California.

Charity
Sutcliffe played on the World Poker Tour in the Hollywood Home games, for the Hollygrove House charity. In 2013, he helped raise funds in support of children's mental health programs in Toronto.

Political activities
When the 2021 storming of the United States Capitol occurred, Sutcliffe denied attending via Twitter, but stated that he would be proud to share a smoke with a certain person who did. Later, in reply to a tweet, he said he was "kidding".

Filmography

Film

Television

Awards and nominations

References

External links
 
 David Sutcliffe talks to theTVaddict.com

1969 births
Living people
20th-century Canadian male actors
21st-century Canadian male actors
Canadian expatriate male actors in the United States
Canadian male film actors
Canadian male television actors
Male actors from Saskatoon
University of Toronto alumni